Maria Noel (born May 22, 1978) is a sprinter who represents the United States Virgin Islands. She competed in the women's 4 × 100 metres relay at the 1996 Summer Olympics.

References

External links
 

1978 births
Living people
Athletes (track and field) at the 1996 Summer Olympics
United States Virgin Islands female sprinters
Olympic track and field athletes of the United States Virgin Islands
Place of birth missing (living people)
Olympic female sprinters
21st-century American women